Bagh Stallions is a franchise cricket team that represents Bagh in the Kashmir Premier League. They were coached by Abdul Rehman and captained by Shan Masood. Originally Shadab Khan was appointed as the captain of the team but Shan Masood took over as captain in place of Khan, who was occupied with the national team.

Squad

Season standings

Points table

League fixtures and results

Statistics

Most runs 

Source:

Most wickets 

Source:

References

External links
 Team Records 2021 at ESPNcricinfo

Kashmir Premier League (Pakistan)